Bilal Ali Hussein Qwaider (born May 7, 1993) is a Jordanian football player of Palestinian descent who plays as a striker for Al-Faisaly.

International goals

With U-19

With U-22

With U-23

None-International Goals

References

External links
 
  

1993 births
Living people
Jordanian footballers
Jordan international footballers
Association football forwards
Al-Wehdat SC players
Al Ansar FC players
Al-Jazeera (Jordan) players
Al-Hussein SC (Irbid) players
Shabab Al-Ordon Club players
Al-Faisaly SC players
Jordanian expatriate footballers
Jordanian expatriate sportspeople in Lebanon
Expatriate footballers in Lebanon
Jordanian people of Palestinian descent
Lebanese Premier League players